Hajiya Fatima Lolo (MON), (born Fatima Muhammad Kolo in Pategi, Royal Niger Company, 1891 – 15 May 1997) was a Nigerian singer, songwriter, and historian.

Early life
Lolo had married twice and could not bear a child in both marriages. She represented the Nupe Kingdom Emirate in most of their festivals and occasions. Before she became famous, she was notable for singing to farmers and hunters while dancing with a plate on her hand. She was later referred to as Sagi Ningbazi (Queen of Musicians) in Nupe language.
She was awarded MON Member of the Order of the Niger by Shehu Shagari.

Lolo died at age 106 on 15 May 1997, after a brief illness.

Poetry
Fatima Lolo was among 33 notable women whose poetry was published in a book.

References

1891 births
1997 deaths
20th-century Nigerian women singers
People from Kwara State
Members of the Order of the Niger
Nigerian centenarians
Women centenarians